A. Arumugam was an Indian politician and former Member of the Legislative Assembly of Tamil Nadu. He was elected to the Tamil Nadu legislative assembly as a Dravida Munnetra Kazhagam candidate from Edapadi constituency in 1967, and 1971 elections.

The only candidate from DMK - Dravida munnetra kazhagam who won Member of legislative assembly (MLA) from Edapadi till now ( 2019)

References 

Dravida Munnetra Kazhagam politicians
Living people
Year of birth missing (living people)
Tamil Nadu MLAs 1967–1972
Tamil Nadu MLAs 1971–1976